Vâlcov may refer to:

Vâlcov, the Romanian name for Vylkove, Ukraine
three brothers, all Romanian football players from Bolgrad:
Colea Vâlcov (1909-1970)
Petea Vâlcov (1910-1943)
Volodea Vâlcov (1916-1952)